Hrayr Dzhoghk (Hrayr The Hell; 1864–13 April 1904), born (Armenak Ghazarian ), also known as Hrair, Hrayr, Tjokhk, Djohkh, Dzhokhk, was an Armenian military leader and strategist, fedayee, statesman  and teacher, part of the Armenian national liberation movement. He was a member of the Armenian Revolutionary Federation.

Life

He was born as Armenak Ghazarian in Aharonk, a village in the Western Armenian Taron canton of Turuberan province. His father was priest Mamprè Ghazarian. Armenak was graduated from the school of Surb Karapet Monastery in Mush during the late 1880s. Later, he studied at the United Armenian College of Mush. He was deeply influenced by the revolutionary ideas of his teacher Mkrtich Saryan. After his graduation, Armenak has worked as a teacher in the Armenian schools of Sasun and Taron. He always wore the traditional Armenian hat of the people of Mush region.

Hrayr and Dzhoghk were his two pen-names, that he used when he contributed articles to the official organ of the Armenian Revolutionary Federation Droshak. At the beginning of his revolutionary career in 1890, he joined the Hunchakian Party and worked closely with the party leaders Mihran Damadian and Hampartsoum Boyadjian. Shortly after, he left the Hunchakian Party in 1893 for ideological differences.

Dzhoghk joined the Armenian Revolutionary Federation and worked with prominent military leaders Aghbiur Serob, Kevork Chavush and Andranik Ozanian. In spring 1894, Hrayr went to the Caucasus to purchase weapons for the Armenian revolutionaries. Then he went to Romania where he joined the Armenian Revolutionary Federation. He believed in rebellion with the participation of the masses, and was one of the leaders of the Sasun Resistance of 1894.

By 1895, Hrayr returned to Western Armenia with a group of 50 young men among which were Andranik Ozanian and Aghbiur Serob. Together with Tatul (Aram Aramian) he organized defense against slaughter in the area of Basen. In June, 1896 both were arrested and placed in prison of Erzurum; Tatul was hanged, Hrayr released on amnesty. Afterward he went to Van and made plans to organize the Van Defense of 1896, then to Sasun (1902) where Hrayr and Andranik were both the main organizers and heads of the Sasun Resistance of 1904. During this defense, he was killed on 13 April in the village Gelieguzan. He was buried near Serob Pasha in the court of a local church. Hrayr and his comrade's bodies were buried by Andranik's soldiers, who came to help the local population.

Views
His views included opposition to insignificant isolated skirmishes and support to the idea of accumulation of forces for wide national revolt.

Legacy
There are a number of folk songs that Armenian people dedicated to his memory.

Sources
S. Kirak, Hrair-Dzhoghk, Asbarez daily, Nov. 27, 1981, p. 3
Dr. A. Chalabian, Gen. Andranik and the Armenian Revolutionary Movement, USA, 1988, pp. 106–107.

External links
 Джохк Грайр (1866—1904)
 ГРАЙР ДЖОХК

1866 births
1904 deaths
Armenian nationalists
People from Bitlis vilayet
Armenian fedayi
Armenians from the Ottoman Empire
Prisoners and detainees of the Ottoman Empire